At least three warships of Japan have borne the name Nisshin:

 a screw sloop launched in 1868 and scrapped in 1893
 a  launched in 1903 and expended as a target in 1936
 a seaplane tender launched in 1939 and sunk in 1943

Japanese Navy ship names
Imperial Japanese Navy ship names